Phichai railway station is a railway station located in Nai Mueang Subdistrict, Phichai District, Uttaradit. It is on the Northern Line of the State Railway of Thailand. Phichai railway station opened as part of the Northern Line extension from Phitsanulok to Ban Dara Junction in November 1908.

There is also a specialty menu at this station that is recommended for those who pass by train. That is the "Kaeng khua hoi khom", a Thai curry with river snails over rice on a banana leaf container sold by hawkers with trays walking along platforms. It is regarded as the signature food of the locality. Because Pichai is a district surrounded by mountains and rivers, it is a place rich in food ingredients.

Train services
 Special Express 3/4 Bangkok-Sawankhalok/Sila At-Bangkok
 Express 51/52 Bangkok-Chiang Mai-Bangkok
 Rapid 102 Chiang Mai Bangkok
 Rapid 105/106 Bangkok-Sila At-Bangkok
 Rapid 107/108 Bangkok-Den Chai-Bangkok
 Rapid 109 Bangkok-Chiang Mai
 Rapid 111/112 Bangkok-Den Chai-Bangkok
 Local 403 Phitsanulok-Sila At
 Local 407/408 Nakhon Sawan-Chiang Mai-Nakhon Sawan
 Local 410 Sila At-Phitsanulok

References
 Ichirō, Kakizaki (2010). Ōkoku no tetsuro: tai tetsudō no rekishi. Kyōto: Kyōtodaigakugakujutsushuppankai. 
 Otohiro, Watanabe (2013). Tai kokutetsu yonsenkiro no tabi: shasō fūkei kanzen kiroku. Tōkyō: Bungeisha. 

Railway stations in Thailand